Craig Ednie (born 16 February 1982) is an Australian rules footballer who played with Richmond in the Australian Football League (AFL).

Ednie, who Richmond secured in the 2000 rookie draft, played just one season of senior AFL football. He had 17 disposals and kicked a goal on his debut, against Melbourne at Docklands. After adding just six more appearances, he was delisted by Richmond at the end of the 2002 season.

He has since been an important figure at Ovens & Murray Football League side Yarrawonga, where he had started his career. In 2006, a premiership year for the club, Ednie won a Morris Medal. He was Yarrawonga's playing coach in their 2009 and 2010 grand final losses to Albury. Since 2017 Ednie has been a playing coach for Rennie Football Club in the Picola & District Football League.

References

1982 births
Australian rules footballers from Victoria (Australia)
Richmond Football Club players
Yarrawonga Football Club players
Living people